The 1989 European Promotion Cup for Women was the first edition of the basketball European Promotion Cup for Women, today known as FIBA Women's European Championship for Small Countries. The tournament took place in Oberanven, Luxembourg, from 13 to 17 December 1989. Austria women's national basketball team won the tournament for the first time.

Participating teams

First round
In the first round, the teams were drawn into two groups of four. The first two teams from each group advance to the semifinals, the other teams will play in the 5th–8th place playoffs.

Group A

Group B

5th–8th place playoffs

5th–8th place semifinals

7th place match

5th place match

Championship playoffs

Semifinals

3rd place match

Final

Final standings

References

FIBA Women's European Championship for Small Countries
Promotion Cup
International sports competitions hosted by Luxembourg
Basketball in Luxembourg
1989 in Luxembourgian sport
European Promotion Cup for Women